The 2010 USA Sevens took place on February 13 and February 14 at Sam Boyd Stadium in Las Vegas, Nevada. It was the fourth Cup trophy in the 2009–10 IRB Sevens World Series. It was the first edition of the USA Sevens to be held in the Las Vegas area; the tournament had been hosted by the Los Angeles suburb of Carson, California from 2004 to 2006, and by San Diego from 2007 to 2009. The USA Sevens is played annually as part of the IRB Sevens World Series for international rugby sevens.

Samoa won the Cup final 33–12 over New Zealand. Samoa was led by Mikaele Pesamino, who scored 11 tries in the tournament, including two intercept tries against New Zealand in the final.
The Plate went to defending series champion South Africa, the Bowl was won by the homestanding USA, and the Shield went to Scotland.

Teams

Pool stages

Pool A
{| class="wikitable" style="text-align: center;"
|-
!width="200"|Team
!width="40"|Pld
!width="40"|W
!width="40"|D
!width="40"|L
!width="40"|PF
!width="40"|PA
!width="40"|+/-
!width="40"|Pts
|- 
|align=left| 
|3||3||0||0||92||19||+73||9
|-
|align=left| 
|3||2||0||1||78||7||+61||7
|-
|align=left| 
|3||0||1||2||24||81||–57||4
|-
|align=left| 
|3||0||1||2||12||94||–82||4
|}

Pool B
{| class="wikitable" style="text-align: center;"
|-
!width="200"|Team
!width="40"|Pld
!width="40"|W
!width="40"|D
!width="40"|L
!width="40"|PF
!width="40"|PA
!width="40"|+/-
!width="40"|Pts
|- 
|align=left| 
| 3 || 3 || 0 || 0 || 52 || 29 || +23 || 9
|-
|align=left| 
| 3 || 2 || 0 || 1 || 71 || 24 || +47 || 7
|-
|align=left| 
| 3 || 1 || 0 || 2 || 50 || 52 || –2 || 5
|-
|align=left| 
| 3 || 0 || 0 || 3 || 17 || 85 || –68 || 3
|}

Pool C
{| class="wikitable" style="text-align: center;"
|-
!width="200"|Team
!width="40"|Pld
!width="40"|W
!width="40"|D
!width="40"|L
!width="40"|PF
!width="40"|PA
!width="40"|+/-
!width="40"|Pts
|- 
|align=left| 
| 3 || 3 || 0 || 0 || 89 || 31 || +58 || 9
|-
|align=left| 
| 3 || 2 || 0 || 1 || 57 || 26 || +31 || 7
|-
|align=left| 
| 3 || 1 || 0 || 2 || 38 || 68 || –30 || 5
|-
|align=left| 
| 3 || 0 || 0 || 3 || 29 || 88 || –59 || 3
|}

Pool D
{| class="wikitable" style="text-align: center;"
|-
!width="200"|Team
!width="40"|Pld
!width="40"|W
!width="40"|D
!width="40"|L
!width="40"|PF
!width="40"|PA
!width="40"|+/-
!width="40"|Pts
|- 
|align=left| 
| 3 || 2 || 1 || 0 || 62 || 27 || +35 || 8
|-
|align=left| 
| 3 || 2 || 0 || 1 || 53 || 46 || +7 || 7
|-
|align=left| 
| 3 || 1 || 0 || 2 || 17 || 46 || –29 || 5
|-
|align=left| 
| 3 || 0 || 1 || 2 || 27 || 40 || –13 || 4
|}

Knockout

Shield

Bowl

Plate

Cup

Player scoring

Most points

Most tries

External links
Official IRB site for the tournament
Official site of tournament organizers

2009–10 IRB Sevens World Series
2010
Sports competitions in Las Vegas
2010 in sports in Nevada
2010 in American rugby union